Euphues: The Anatomy of Wit , a didactic romance written by John Lyly, was entered in the Stationers' Register 2 December 1578 and published that same year. It was followed by Euphues and his England, registered on 25 July 1579, but not published until Spring of 1580. The name Euphues is derived from Greek ευφυής (euphuēs) meaning "graceful, witty."  Lyly adopted the name from Roger Ascham's The Scholemaster, which describes Euphues as a type of student who is "apte by goodnes of witte, and appliable by readines of will, to learning, hauving all other qualities of the mind and partes of the bodie, that must an other day serue learning, not trobled, mangled, and halfed, but sounde, whole, full & hable to do their office" (194).   Lyly's mannered style is characterized by parallel arrangements and periphrases.

The style of these novels gave rise to the term euphuism.

Thomas Carlyle made reference to the character in his essay of social criticism, "Signs of the Times" (1829).

Notes

External links
 The anatomy of wit and Euphues and his England (Edward Arber, 1868) on Archive.org.
 Euphues and his England: transcript in original spelling.

1578 books
English novels
1570s novels
Literary characters introduced in the 1570s